Anggun C. Sasmi... Lah!!! is the fourth Indonesian-language studio album by Anggun. Her first self-produced album, it was released in 1993 by her own label, Bali Cipta Records. It became Anggun's final studio album in her homeland before moving to Europe to embark on an international career. Rock music remained a notable element on the album, which features composition from Grass Rock and a band founded to accompany Anggun when she played live, The Lost Boy. The record spawned a huge hit, "Kembalilah Kasih (Kita Harus Bicara)", whose music video was directed by Indonesian actress Ria Irawan. The album has two different artworks for the cassette and CD edition, both of which were created by Dik Doank.

Track listing

References
 Anggun C. Sasmi... Lah!!!. Album description in Indonesian.
 Anggun Indonesian Discography

1993 albums
Anggun albums
Indonesian-language albums